Stormzy is a British recording artist who has received numerous nominations and awards for his work in music throughout his career. In 2018, his debut album Gang Signs & Prayer became the first rap album to win the Brit Award for British Album of the Year.

AIM Independent Music Awards
The AIM Independent Music Awards are hosted by the Association of Independent Music (AIM) and were established in 2011 to recognise artists signed to independent record labels in the United Kingdom. Stormzy has received three awards from five nominations.

!
|-
| rowspan="2"| 2016
| rowspan="3"| Stormzy
| Independent Breakthrough of the Year
| 
| style="text-align:center;"|
|-
| Innovator Award
| 
| style="text-align:center;"|
|-
| rowspan="3"| 2017
| Most Played New Independent Act
| 
| rowspan="2" style="text-align:center;"|
|-
| Gang Signs & Prayer
| Independent Album of the Year
| 
|-
| "Big for Your Boots"
| Independent Track of the Year
| 
| style="text-align:center;"|
|}

BBC Music Awards
The BBC Music Awards are the BBC's inaugural pop music awards. First held in 2014, the awards celebrate the musical achievements of the past 12 months. Stormzy had received one award from two nominations. 

!
|-
| rowspan="2"| 2017
| Stormzy
| Artist of the Year
| 
| rowspan="2" style="text-align:center;"|
|-
| Gang Signs & Prayer
| Album of the Year
| 
|}

BET Awards
The BET Awards were established in 2001 by the Black Entertainment Television network to celebrate African Americans and other minorities in music, acting, sports, and other fields of entertainment. Stormzy has received two awards from four nominations. 

!
|-
| 2015
| rowspan="5"| Stormzy
| rowspan="2"| Best International Act: UK
| 
| style="text-align:center;"|
|-
| 2016
| 
| style="text-align:center;"|
|-
| 2017
| Best International Act: Europe
| 
| style="text-align:center;"|
|-
| 2018
| rowspan="2"| Best International Act
| 
| style="text-align:center;"|
|-
| 2020
| 
| style="text-align:center;"|
|}

BET Hip Hop Awards
The BET Hip Hop Awards were established in 2006 by the Black Entertainment Television network to celebrate African Americans and Hip Hop Culture. Stormzy has received one awards from one nomination. 

!
|-
| 2020
| rowspan="1"| Stormzy
| rowspan="1"| Best International Flow
| 
| style="text-align:center;"|
|}

Brit Awards
The Brit Awards are the British Phonographic Industry's (BPI) annual pop music awards. Stormzy has received three awards from five nominations.

!
|-
| 2017
| rowspan="2"| Stormzy
| British Breakthrough Act
| 
| style="text-align:center;"|
|-
| rowspan="2"| 2018
| British Male Solo Artist
| 
| rowspan="2" style="text-align:center;"|
|-
| Gang Signs & Prayer
| British Album of the Year
| 
|-
| rowspan="2"| 2020
| Stormzy
| British Male Solo Artist
| 
| rowspan="2" style="text-align:center;"|
|-
| Vossi Bop
| British Song of the Year
| 
|-
| rowspan="3"| 2023
| rowspan="2"| Stormzy
| British Artist of the Year
| 
| rowspan="3" style="text-align:center;"|
|-
| Best Hip Hop/Grime/Rap Act
| 
|-
| This Is What I Mean
| British Album of the Year
| 
|-
|}

Global Awards
The Global Awards honours the best in UK music as reflected by its list of Global radio stations. Stormzy has received two awards from two nominations. 

!
|-
| rowspan="2"| 2018
| Power (with Little Mix)
| Best Song
| 
| rowspan="2" style="text-align:center;"|
|-
| Stormzy
| Best RnB, Hip Hop or Grime 
| 
|}

GQ Men of the Year Awards
The GQ Men of the Year Awards annually celebrate men who all represent GQ, from the best of film, music, sport, TV, books, politics and more. Stormzy has received two awards from two nominations. 

!
|-
| 2017
| rowspan="2"| Stormzy
| rowspan="2"| Solo Artist of the Year
|
| style="text-align:center;"|
|-
| 2019
| 
| style="text-align:center;"|
|-
|}

Ivor Novello Awards
The Ivor Novello Awards celebrate, honour and reward excellence in British songwriting and composing.

!
|-
| rowspan="2"| 2018
| "Don’t Cry For Me"
| Best Contemporary Song
| 
| style="text-align:center;"|
|-
| Gang Signs & Prayer
| Album Award
| 
| style="text-align:center;"|
|}

Mercury Prize
The Mercury Prize, formerly the Mercury Music Prize, is an annual music prize awarded for the best album from the United Kingdom or Ireland. Stormzy has received one nomination.

!
|-
| 2017
| Gang Signs & Prayer
| Album of the Year	
| 
| style="text-align:center;"|
|}

MOBO Awards
The Music of Black Origin Awards (MOBO), first presented in 1996, are held annually in the United Kingdom to recognise and honour the artistic and technical achievements of exceptional British and international talent in the musical fields of Hip Hop, Grime, RnB/Soul, Reggae, Jazz, Gospel, and African music. Stormzy has received six awards from eleven nominations. 

!
|-
| 2014
| rowspan="3"| Stormzy
| rowspan="2"| Best Grime
| 
| style="text-align:center;"|
|-
| rowspan="3"| 2015
| 
| rowspan="3" style="text-align:center;"|
|-
| Best Male
| 
|-
| "Know Me From"
| Best Video
| 
|-
| rowspan="2"| 2016
| rowspan="4"| Stormzy
| Best Male
| 
| rowspan="2" style="text-align:center;"|
|-
| rowspan="2"| Best Grime 
| 
|-
| rowspan="5"| 2017
| 
| rowspan="5" style="text-align:center;"|
|-
| Best Male
| 
|-
| Gang Signs & Prayer
| Best Album
| 
|-
| rowspan="2"| "Big for Your Boots"
| Best Video
| 
|-
| Best Song
| 
|}

MTV Europe Music Awards
The MTV Europe Music Awards were established in 1994 by MTV Networks Europe to celebrate the most popular music videos in Europe. Stormzy has received one award from three nominations.  

!
|-
| rowspan="3"| 2017
| rowspan="4"| Stormzy
|-
| Best Worldwide Act
| 
| style="text-align:center;"|
|-
| rowspan="2"|Best UK & Ireland Act
| 
| style="text-align:center;"|
|-
| 2018
| 
| style="text-align:center;"|
|}

NME Awards
The NME Awards were created by the NME magazine and was first held in 1953. Stormzy has received two nominations.  

!
|-
| rowspan="2"| 2018
| rowspan="2"| Stormzy
| Best British Solo Artist
| 
| rowspan="2" style="text-align:center;"|
|-
| Best Live Artist
| 
|}

Q Awards
The Q Awards are the United Kingdom's annual music awards run by the music magazine Q to honour musical excellence. Winners are voted by readers of Q online, with others decided by a judging panel. Stormzy has received two awards from six nominations.  

!
|-
| rowspan="3"| 2017
| Gang Signs & Prayer
| Best Album
| 
| rowspan="2" style="text-align:center;"|
|-
| rowspan="3"| Stormzy
| Best Live Act
| 
|-
| rowspan="2"| Best Solo Artist 
| 
| style="text-align:center;"|
|-
| rowspan="3"| 2019
| 
| style="text-align:center;"|
|-
| "Vossi Bop" 
| Best Track
| 
| rowspan="2 style="text-align:center;"|
|-
| Stormzy - Glastonbury 
| Best Live Performance
| 
|}

Rated Awards
The Rated Awards, launched in 2015, honour the best in UK urban music. Stormzy has received three awards from eight nominations.  

!
|-
| rowspan="3"| 2015
| rowspan="2"| "Know Me From"
| Best Track
| 
| style="text-align:center;"|
|-
| Best Video
| 
| style="text-align:center;"|
|-
| rowspan="3"| Stormzy
| rowspan="3"| Artist of the Year
| 
| style="text-align:center;"|
|-
| 2016
| 
| style="text-align:center;"|
|-
| rowspan="4"| 2017
| 
| rowspan="2" style="text-align:center;"|
|-
| rowspan="2"| "Big for Your Boots"
| Best Video
| 
|-
| Best Track
| 
| rowspan="2" style="text-align:center;"|
|-
| Gang Signs & Prayer
| Best Album
| 
|}

Silver Clef Awards
The Silver Clef Awards recognise and celebrate the outstanding talent of artists who through their music have touched the lives of many thousands of people. Stormzy has received two nominations.  

!
|-
| 2017
| rowspan="2"| Stormzy
| rowspan="2"| Best Live Act	
| 
| style="text-align:center;"|
|-
| 2018
| 
| style="text-align:center;"|
|}

South Bank Sky Arts Awards
The South Bank Sky Arts Awards celebrates the best of British culture and achievement. Stormzy has received two awards from two nominations.  

!
|-
| 2016
| Stormzy
| The Times Breakthrough Award
| 
| style="text-align:center;"|
|-
| 2018
| Gang Signs & Prayer
| Best Pop Album 
| 
| style="text-align:center;"|
|}

UK Music Video Awards
The UK Music Video Awards is an annual award ceremony founded in 2008 to recognize creativity, technical excellence and innovation in music videos. Stormzy has received two awards from four nomination.  

!
|-
| 2018
| Gang Signs & Prayer
| rowspan="2"| Best Urban Video	
| 
| style="text-align:center;"|
|-
| rowspan="3"| 2019
| rowspan="3"| "Vossi Bop"
| 
| rowspan="2" style="text-align:center;"|
|-
| Video of the Year
| 
|-
| Best Cinematography 
| 
| style="text-align:center;"|
|}

References

Stormzy